Mykhailo Ivanovych Khmelko (23 October 1919 - 15 January 1996) was a Ukrainian painter, People's Artist of the Ukrainian SSR, and double Stalin prize winner.

Mykhailo Khmelko was born in Kiev. In 1943-1946 he studied at the Kiev State Art Institute under Karp Trokhimenko. In 1948 - 1973 he was a faculty of the same institute.

Khmelko is known for his Socialist Realism paintings: Unification of the Ukrainian Lands (1939-1949), Drink A Toast for the Great Russian People (1947), Triumph of the Victorious Motherland (1949), Forever with Moscow. Forever with Russian people (1951). He is also the author of the diorama Medical Help in the Bohdan Khmelnytsky army of the Kiev Museum of Medicine.

[[Image:Hmelko NavekiSRusskimNarodom.jpg|thumb|500px|center|Mikhail Khmelko. Forever with Moscow. Forever with the Russian People (Treaty of Pereyaslav). 1951 ]]

 Sources 
 Mikhail Ivanovich Khmelko Kievskiye Vedomosti N73, 6 April 2007 
 M. Khmelko in Russian history in the mirror of visual arts'' 
 Passion to Find and Give Zerkalo Nedeli N39 (260) 2 October 1999

External links 
 Kmelko works on The Bridgeman Art Library

Artists from Kyiv
Soviet painters
Stalin Prize winners
Ukrainian painters
Ukrainian male painters
1919 births
1975 deaths
20th-century Russian painters
Russian male painters